Knabe is a German word meaning boy, cognate with the English word knave.

In English-language use it appears as a surname, for the following people:

 Don Knabe (born 1943), American politician
 Kerstin Knabe (born 1959), German athlete
 Morgan Knabe (born 1981), breaststroke swimmer from Canada
 Otto Knabe (1884 – 1961), American baseball player
 Sebastian Knabe (born 1978), German decathlete
 Wilhelm Knabe (1923–2021), German ecologist, pacifist, civil servant and politician
 Wm. Knabe & Co., piano manufacturing company founded by Wilhelm Knabe (1803 - 1864)
 Wolfgang Knabe (born 1959), German athlete
 Eva Schulze-Knabe (1907 - 1976) German painter